Route 113 is a north/south two lane highway in northern Quebec, Canada. It starts at Route 117 just north of Louvicourt (now part of Val-d'Or) and continues north and north-east roughly until Waswanipi from where it continues east until it ends at Route 167 in Chibougamau. For most of its length, Route 113 goes through sparsely populated areas but where logging is an important economic activity.

Municipalities along Route 113

 Val-d'Or
 Senneterre
 Lebel-sur-Quévillon
 Baie-James
 Desmaraisville
 Waswanipi
 Chapais
 Chibougamau

Major intersections

See also
 List of Quebec provincial highways

References

External links  
 Official Transport Quebec Road Map Provincial Route Map (Transports Quebec) 
 Route 113 on Google Maps

113
Chibougamau
Val-d'Or